Thomas Halliday (c.1780 - c.1854) was an English coin and medal engraver associated with the Royal Birmingham Society of Artists.

Halliday worked as an engraver at the Soho Mint in Handsworth, West Midlands. Following this, he set up his own business moving to numerous locations throughout Birmingham before settling at Newhall Street until his death. He had many apprentices including Peter Wyon, a member of a large family of engravers.

Engraver of Canadian colonial tokens
Halliday is known to have engraved dies for a number of copper tokens that were used in pre-Confederation Canada. These include the Bust and Commerce series, the Pure Copper Preferable to Paper series, and the “R.H. tokens” among others.

References

Members and Associates of the Royal Birmingham Society of Artists
19th-century engravers
English engravers
People from Handsworth, West Midlands
1780 births
1854 deaths